Maryland's Legislative District 25 is one of 47 districts in the state for the Maryland General Assembly. It covers part of Prince George's County.

Demographic characteristics
As of the 2020 United States census, the district had a population of 125,974, of whom 98,881 (78.5%) were of voting age. The racial makeup of the district was 6,635 (5.3%) White, 103,109 (81.8%) African American, 572 (0.5%) Native American, 1,878 (1.5%) Asian, 13 (0.0%) Pacific Islander, 7,548 (6.0%) from some other race, and 6,188 (4.9%) from two or more races. Hispanic or Latino of any race were 11,485 (9.1%) of the population.

The district had 90,179 registered voters as of October 17, 2020, of whom 8,920 (9.9%) were registered as unaffiliated, 3,213 (3.6%) were registered as Republicans, 76,365 (84.7%) were registered as Democrats, and 1,408 (1.6%) were registered to other parties.

Political representation
The district is represented for the 2023–2027 legislative term in the State Senate by Melony G. Griffith (D) and in the House of Delegates by Darryl Barnes (D), Nick Charles (D) and Karen Toles (D).

References

Prince George's County, Maryland
25
25